GX Velorum is a solitary variable star in the southern constellation of Vela. It is visible to the naked eye as a faint, blue-white hued star with an apparent visual magnitude that fluctuates around 4.99. Based upon parallax measurements, it is located approximately 4,200 light years distant from the Sun, and is drifting further away with a radial velocity of +28 km/s. It may be a member of the Vela OB1 association of co-moving stars.

This object is a massive blue supergiant with a stellar classification of B5 Ia. It is suspected to be an Alpha Cygni-type pulsating variable and ranges in brightness from 4.97 down to 5.04 magnitude. The star is 8.3 million years old with 35 times the mass of the Sun. It has expanded to around 61 times the Sun's radius and is radiating 214,000 times the luminosity of the Sun from its enlarged photosphere at an effective temperature of 15,000 K.

References

B-type supergiants
Alpha Cygni variables

Vela (constellation)
Durchmusterung objects
079186
045085
3654
Velorum, GX